Orophia denisella is a species of moth in the family Depressariidae. It was described by Michael Denis and Ignaz Schiffermüller in 1775. It is found from Spain and France to Romania and Bulgaria and from Germany to Italy and North Macedonia. It has also been recorded from Russia.

References

Moths described in 1775
Orophia
Moths of Europe